Victor Newcombe Thorpe was a Member of the Legislative Assembly of Nova Scotia, Canada for the constituency of Kings North. He sat as a member of the Progressive Conservative Party of Nova Scotia from 1967 to 1974.

Thorpe was born in Centreville, Nova Scotia. He was elected in 1967, and was re-elected in 1970.  He did not re-offer in 1974.

References

Progressive Conservative Association of Nova Scotia MLAs
1912 births
1985 deaths